The USCGC Iris (WLB-395) was a  belonging to the United States Coast Guard launched on 18 May 1944 and commissioned on 11 August 1944.

Design
The Iris-class buoy tenders were constructed after the Mesquite-class buoy tenders. She was powered by one electric motor. This was connected up to two Westinghouse generators which were driven by two CooperBessemer GND-8 four-cycle diesel engines. She had a single screw.

The ships had a complement of six officers and seventy-four crew members in 1945; this decreased to two warrants, four officers, and forty-seven men in 1966. They were fitted with a SL1 radar system and QBE-3A sonar system in 1945. Their armament consisted of one 3"/50 caliber gun, two 20 mm/80 guns, two Mousetraps, two depth charge tracks, and four Y-guns in 1945; these were removed in 1966.

Career 

Upon receiving her commission, Iris was assigned to the 8th Coast Guard District and homeported in Galveston, Texas where she was used for general ATON duties through the end of the war. In April 1947, she assisted with evacuating the injured from the Texas City disaster in which  carrying ammonium nitrate exploded.  After assisting with evacuations, Iris returned to the scene to assist with fighting the numerous fires that had spawned. In April 1989, she responded out to the Exxon Valdez oil spill and assisted with the clean up of Prince William Sound. In 1997, she was transferred to the Maritime Administration.

See also
 List of United States Coast Guard cutters

References

External links

Iris-class seagoing buoy tenders
1944 ships
Historic American Engineering Record in Oregon
Ships built in Duluth, Minnesota